ETHA Engomis FC was a Cypriot football club based in Engomi, Nicosia. Founded in 1962, it played in the fourth division.

The team dissolved after 1988. The team was part of the sports club ETHA Engomis.

References

Defunct football clubs in Cyprus
Association football clubs established in 1962
1962 establishments in Cyprus